Juan Bautista Pina (born 19 July 1907, date of death unknown) was an Argentine sprinter. He competed in the men's 100 metres at the 1928 Summer Olympics.

References

1907 births
Year of death missing
Athletes (track and field) at the 1928 Summer Olympics
Argentine male sprinters
Olympic athletes of Argentina
Place of birth missing
20th-century Argentine people